Attica is a 2006 children's fantasy novel by the British writer Garry Kilworth.

Plot summary
12-year-old Chloe and her brothers: Jordy, 12, and Alex, 10, have the adventure of a lifetime.

Chloe and Alex's father died of a heart attack when they were just 8 and respectively, 6. Their mother, Dipa has been trying to find a new husband since her children's father died. When she does, the kids have a surprise: they are going to have a new brother. Jordy, three months older than Chloe, is the exact opposite of Chloe and Alex, so they are not so happy when their family enlarges to five members.

Ben, Jordy's father and Chloe and Alex's stepfather is a paramedic and Dipa, a doctor, so the kids are used not having their parents at home. But when they move to Winchester to a rented apartment everything is going to change.
Mr. John Grantham, the old man that rented them half of the house he lives in, tells Chloe about the girl he loved in the 1930s and 1940s. Susan married a much richer and older man, but she gave Grantham a clock that sings Frère Jacques, a clock that he cannot find. Chloe offers to take her brothers and to search in the attic and so the adventure begins.

On their way, Chloe, Jordy and Alex discover all kinds of dark secrets of the attic, which they have named "Attica", and all sorts of weird characters, such as Atticans, a strange race of creatures with bumps on their heads that think that all humans are ghosts and monsters of the Attic.

Characters
Chloe, born September 1994, main character
Alex, born 1996, main character
Jordy, born July 1994, main character

2006 British novels
2006 fantasy novels
British children's novels
Children's fantasy novels
British fantasy novels
Novels set in Hampshire
2006 children's books
British children's books